Tomáš Brcko (born February 8, 1988) is a Slovak professional ice hockey defenceman who is currently playing with the Sheffield Steeldogs of the English Premier Ice Hockey League (EPIHL)

References

External links

1988 births
Living people
HC Prešov players
MHC Martin players
MHK Dolný Kubín players
MsHK Žilina players
Sheffield Scimitars players
Slovak ice hockey defencemen
Sportspeople from Martin, Slovakia
Expatriate ice hockey players in England
Expatriate ice hockey players in Norway
Slovak expatriate sportspeople in England
Slovak expatriate sportspeople in Norway
Slovak expatriate ice hockey people